Ontario Forest Research Institute (OFRI) is a division of the Ministry of Natural Resources and Forestry (MNRF) located in Sault Ste. Marie, Ontario, Canada. This institute is composed of research scientists, specialists, statisticians, technicians, management, and administrative staff. OFRI research helps provide sustainable management of Ontario Forests and Natural Resources.

External links
 Ontario Forest Research Institute

Ontario government departments and agencies
Sault Ste. Marie, Ontario
Forest research institutes
Forestry in Canada